Bobby Hosea (born 1955) is an American film and television actor. He played O. J. Simpson in the Fox movie The O. J. Simpson Story. and John Allen Muhammad in D.C. Sniper: 23 Days of Fear. He is the head of Train 'Em Up Academy, Inc., and the creator of Dip-N-rip Sticks, 12-Step Tackle Training System.

Filmography

Film

Television

Football career
Hosea formerly played football for UCLA.

Personal life
He has been married to Marcia Hairston from 1980 to the present.

References

Further reading

"Bobby Hosea Stars As Sniper Suspect John Allen Muhammad In 'DC Sniper: 23 Days Of Fear'" from The Virginian-Pilot
"Bobby Hosea - a rising star" from Pittsburgh Courier
"Bobby Hosea, a Man of Duty and Honor" from Los Angeles Sentinel

External links

Living people
Place of birth missing (living people)
African-American male actors
American male film actors
American male television actors
UCLA Bruins football players
20th-century American male actors
21st-century American male actors
1955 births
20th-century African-American people
21st-century African-American people